St. Catherine College (Portuguese: Colégio Santa Catarina) is a Brazilian Catholic school located in Novo Hamburgo, Rio Grande do Sul.

History
The school was established in 1900 with fifteen students. It inaugurated a new building in 1950.

See also

 Catholic Church in Brazil
 Education in Brazil
 List of schools in Brazil

References

External links
 , the school's official website (in Portuguese)

1900 establishments in Brazil
Buildings and structures in Novo Hamburgo
Education in Rio Grande do Sul
Educational institutions established in 1900
Catholic secondary schools in Brazil